Antanamitarana is a rural municipality in Madagascar.  It belongs to the district of Antsiranana II, which is a part of Diana Region.  The population of the municipality was estimated to be approximately 6227 in 2016. 

It is situated at 8 km South of Diego Suarez, on the National Road 6. The airport of Diego Suarez is in this municipality.
5 villages belong to this municipality: Maromagniry, Antafiamalama, Antanamitarana, Ambodimagnary and Ambodimanga.

References

Populated places in Diana Region